Enon Gavin is a former Gaelic footballer from County Roscommon, Ireland. He played with the Roscommon intercounty team from 1991 until 2000. In his first intercounty season he won a Connacht Senior Football Championship in 1991; he also won an All Star Award that year.

He played at club level also with Clan na Gael. He won seven Roscommon Senior Football Championship medals and two Connacht Senior Club Football Championship medals. He is the former manager of the Longford based Rathcline GAA club, who were promoted to Senior level in 2015. 

References
http://hoganstand.com/roscommon/ArticleForm.aspx?ID=25305

1971 births
Living people
Clan na Gael (Roscommon) Gaelic footballers
Roscommon inter-county Gaelic footballers